Asante Duah Ma'at (born October 20, 2001) known professionally as Asante Blackk, is an American actor. He is best known for his role in the miniseries When They See Us (2019), for which he received a Primetime Emmy Award nomination. He has been a series regular of the television series This Is Us since 2019, for which he was nominated for a Critics' Choice Television Award.

Early life and career 
Blackk began acting as an elementary school student at Judith P. Hoyer Montessori School. His first role was Mowgli in a performance of The Jungle Book. One of his first professional roles was in "How I Learned to Be a Kid" at the Howard Theatre in Washington, after which he got an agent. Blackk originally auditioned for the role of Korey Wise, one of the exonerated members of the Central Park Five, in the dramatized miniseries When They See Us but was instead cast as the 14-year-old Kevin Richardson in the series. The role earned him an Primetime Emmy Award nomination, making him one of the youngest nominees in its history. Since 2019, he has appeared as a series regular in This Is Us.

He will make his film debut in Cory Finley's Landscape with Invisible Hand.

Personal life 
He is the nephew of actress Samira Wiley.

Filmography

Film

Television

Awards and nominations

References

External links
 

2001 births
Living people
American male child actors
American male stage actors
American male television actors
21st-century American male actors
Male actors from Maryland
People from Waldorf, Maryland